The Mitsubishi MU-2 is a Japanese high-wing, twin-engine turboprop aircraft with a pressurized cabin manufactured by Mitsubishi Heavy Industries. It made its maiden flight in September 1963 and was produced until 1986. It is one of postwar Japan's most successful aircraft, with 704 manufactured in Japan and San Angelo, Texas, in the United States.

Design and development

Work on the MU-2, Mitsubishi's first postwar aircraft design, began in 1956. Designed as a light twin turboprop transport suitable for a variety of civil and military roles, the MU-2 first flew on 14 September 1963. This first MU-2, and the three MU-2As built, were powered by the Turbomeca Astazou turboprop.

Civil MU-2s powered by Garrett engines were certified as variants of the MU-2B, using the MU-2B type followed by a number. For marketing purposes, each variant was given a suffix letter; the MU-2B-10, for example, was sold as the MU-2D, while the MU-2B-36A was marketed as the MU-2N.

The MU-2 has a high cruise speed coupled with a low landing speed. This is accomplished by using over-wing spoilers instead of conventional ailerons for roll control, allowing the use of full-span double-slotted flaps on the trailing edge of the wing; the very large flaps give the MU-2 wing loading comparable to a Beechcraft King Air in landing configuration, while having wing loading comparable to a light jet in cruise. The spoilers are highly effective, even when the MU-2 wing is stalled, and the lack of ailerons eliminates adverse yaw.

Production
In 1963, Mitsubishi granted Mooney Aircraft rights in North America to assemble, sell, and support the MU-2. In 1965, Mooney established a facility to assemble MU-2s at its new factory in San Angelo, Texas. Major components were shipped from Japan, and the San Angelo factory installed engines, avionics, and interiors, then painted, flight tested, and delivered the completed aircraft to customers. By 1969, Mooney was in financial difficulty, and the San Angelo facility was taken over by Mitsubishi. Production in the United States ended in 1986. The last Japanese-built aircraft was completed in January 1987.

The subsequent production aircraft, designated MU-2B, were delivered with the Garrett TPE331 engines that remained standard on all later models. Thirty-four MU-2Bs were built, followed by 18 examples of the similar MU-2D. The Japanese armed forces purchased four unpressurized MU-2Cs and 16 search and rescue variants designated MU-2E. Featuring slightly more powerful upgraded TPE331 engines, 95 examples of the MU-2F were sold.

Beginning with the MU-2G, the fuselage was stretched. The MU-2M, of which only 28 were built, is regarded as the toughest and most desired of all short-bodied MU-2s, especially with a −10 engine conversion. It had a short fuselage and the same engines as the MU-2K and stretched MU-2J, and had an increase in cabin pressurization to 6.0 psi; it was followed by the MU-2P, which had newer, four-blade propellers. The final short-fuselage MU-2s produced were known as Solitaires and were fitted with  Garrett TPE331-10-501M engines.

The first significant change to the airframe came with the stretched MU-2G, first flying 10 January 1969, which featured a 1.91 m (6 ft 3 in) longer fuselage than earlier models; 46 were built before being succeeded by the more powerful MU-2J (108 constructed). The MU-2L (29 built) was a higher-gross-weight variant, followed by the MU-2N (39 built) with uprated engines and four-blade propellers. The final stretched-fuselage MU-2 was named the Marquise, and like the Solitaire, used  TPE331 engines.

Operational history

Military service

Japan

The Japan Self-Defense Forces are the only military operators to have flown the MU-2 in front-line service.

Ground Self-Defense Force
The four C-model aircraft built, in addition to 16 MU-2Ks, entered service with the Japan Ground Self-Defense Force (JGSDF) with the designation LR-1; they were used as liaison and photo reconnaissance aircraft. They were retired in 2016. A number of them have been placed as gate guardians at JGSDF bases.

Air Self-Defense Force
29 MU-2Es were purchased by the Japan Air Self-Defense Force as search-and-rescue aircraft and designated MU-2S. Additional equipment consisted of a "thimble" nose radome, increased fuel capacity, bulged observation windows, and a sliding door for dropping rafts. They were replaced in 2008 by the British Aerospace U-125A. Some have been preserved.

Argentina 
Four civilian MU-2 (LV-MCV, LV-MOP, LV-OAN and LV-ODZ) were acquired by the Argentine Air Force during the Falkland War. These Mitsubishi were unarmed, but used during combat operations by the Escuadrón Fénix as pathfinders, reconnaissance and comm-relay planes. Among their missions were flying as guiding planes to the IA-58 Pucará replacements required after losses on the raid on Pebble Island.

New Zealand
In late 2009 the Royal New Zealand Air Force (RNZAF) took delivery of four Mitsubishi MU-2F fixed-wing training aircraft from the United States for use as training aids. In New Zealand service they are known as the Mitsubishi MU-2 Sumo. The aircraft were ferried to New Zealand and are located at the RNZAF's Ground Training Wing (GTW) at RNZAF Base Woodbourne near Blenheim in New Zealand's South Island.

United States
Since 1987 MU-2s have been flown by retired United States Air Force pilots working under government contract at Tyndall Air Force Base, Florida, where they provide U.S. Air Force undergraduate Air Battle Manager students of the U.S. Air Force Weapons Controller School with their initial experience controlling live aircraft. In the tactical simulations, the aircraft usually represent F-15s and Mikoyan MiG-29s. Students must control eight MU-2 missions before they can progress to controlling high-performance aircraft such as F-15s or F-22s.

Flight around the world
On 25 August 2013 Mike Laver, owner and pilot of N50ET (a −10 engine converted 1974 K-model equipped with 5-blade MT-composite propellers, which had just received a Supplemental Type Certificate (STC) under Air 1st of Aiken, South Carolina), along with AOPA Pilot technical editor Mike Collins, embarked on an around-the-world journey in the MU-2B-25. The voyage commenced at Aiken Municipal Airport and visited Nagoya, Japan, on 14 September 2013, the 50th anniversary of the MU-2.

Safety concerns
In the United States, the MU-2 had a spotty safety record during its early decades, as its high performance coupled with a relatively low purchase price appealed to amateur pilots who did not appreciate how demanding it is to fly compared to slower piston engined aircraft. Inexperience with the MU-2's higher speeds, altitudes, and climb and descent rates resulted in many crashes. In Europe, pilots were required to obtain a specific type rating to fly the MU-2, resulting in roughly half the accident rate of early operations in the U.S.

Some of the aircraft's flight characteristics may be unfamiliar to pilots accustomed to slower light piston twins. Standard engine-out procedures are counterproductive when flying the MU-2: the commonly taught procedure of reducing flap following an engine failure on takeoff leads to a critical reduction in lift in the MU-2 with its unusually large and effective flaps. When pilots were taught to retain takeoff flap and reduce climb rate after an engine failure, MU-2 takeoff accident rates were reduced. Additionally, the MU-2 is sensitive to trim settings, and it is critical to promptly trim the aircraft properly in all phases of flight. The absence of adverse yaw eliminates the need to use rudder for coordinated flight, but proper and prompt use of rudder is vital to counter the aircraft's tendency to roll in reaction to engine torque; at low airspeed, the aircraft will rapidly roll and enter an accelerated stall if the pilot applies full power without adequate preparation, and safe recovery from this condition is very difficult at low altitude.

Most crashes early in the type's service life were attributable to pilot error; however, in 1981, four uncontrolled descents from altitude prompted the United States National Transportation Safety Board (NTSB) to initiate separate investigations into the cabin pressurization system and autopilot, but the outcome was inconclusive. In 1983, after more crashes, the NTSB convinced the Federal Aviation Administration (FAA) to perform a more comprehensive study of various aircraft systems; the study ultimately did not fault the MU-2's design, but the repeated investigations had damaged the aircraft's reputation by this time. This prompted Mitsubishi, in cooperation with FlightSafety International, to initiate the Pilot's Review of Proficiency (PROP) seminar program to better educate MU-2 pilots about the aircraft's characteristics. The PROP seminars were suspended following the end of MU-2 production in 1986 but were reinstated in 1994 due to continuing accidents.

The aircraft's accident rate caused resale values to fall and prompted Mitsubishi to campaign the FAA to require an MU-2 type rating. In 2005, the FAA undertook another safety evaluation of the MU-2 and concluded that a properly maintained MU-2 was safe when operated by well-trained pilot; however, the study also found that training standards were inconsistent, and sometimes recommended unusual or unauthorized procedures. In 2006, the FAA issued a Special Federal Air Regulation (SFAR) directed at MU-2 operations, with standards exceeding a type rating in some aspects. The training curriculum was standardized and pilots required to receive type-specific initial and recurrent training. A fully functional autopilot became a requirement for single-pilot operations, and FAA-approved checklists and operating manuals must be on board at all times. Unusual for this SFAR, pilot experience in other aircraft types cannot be used to comply with MU-2 operational requirements.

By 2011, the SFAR was credited with lowering MU-2 accident rates below those for similar turboprop aircraft. Additionally, although some owners had worried that the SFAR would depress aircraft prices even further, resale values rebounded as potential owners recognized that the aircraft is very safe with a properly trained pilot. PROP seminars continue to be held biennially and count towards MU-2 training requirements, and have become popular social events for MU-2 operators and even potential buyers, as MU-2 ownership is not required for attendance.

The aircraft had several airworthiness issues early in its service history. Airworthiness directives (ADs) were issued for nose gear cracks and various problems with the TPE331 engine. In April 1993, an emergency AD was issued after four serious accidents, two of them fatal, caused by propeller blade separations in aircraft equipped with similar three and four-blade Hartzell propellers; the AD required immediate inspections of the propeller assemblies having more than 3,000 flight hours, and also covered various other aircraft types, but focused on the MU-2B-60 since it was the heaviest aircraft using these propellers. Despite these early problems, aviation experts have characterized the MU-2 as being robustly designed and constructed, and relatively few MU-2 crashes have been directly attributed to mechanical or structural failures.

Variants

Short fuselage
XMU-2
Astazou-powered prototype, one built
MU-2A
Astazou-powered development aircraft, three built.
MU-2B
Production variant with Garrett TPE331 engines, 34 built.
MU-2C (MU-2B-10)
Unpressurized variant for the Japan Ground Self-Defense Force, four built.
MU-2D (MU-2B-10)
Improved MU-2B, higher operating altitude and bladder fuel tanks rather than wet-wings, 18 built.
MU-2DP (MU-2B-15)
MU-2D with 90-gallon tip tanks and upgraded engines, three built.
MU-2E
Unpressurized variant for the Japanese military designated MU-2S
MU-2F (MU-2B-20)
Variant with improved engines and 90-gallon tip tanks as MU-2DP but certified at a higher gross weight and additional fuel tanks, 95 built.
MU-2K (MU-2B-25)
Short fuselage variant of the MU-2J, 83 built.
MU-2M (MU-2B-26)
Revised variant of the MU-2K with increased weight, and increased cabin pressure, 27 built.
MU-2P (MU-2B-26A)
Improved variant with four-bladed propellers and improvements as MU-2N, 31 built.
Solitaire (MU-2B-40)
Variant with improved engines and increased fuel capacity, 57 built between 1979 and 1985.

Long fuselage
MU-2G (MU-2B-30)
Stretched variant with a 1.91m increase in length, larger cabin and change to landing gear configuration, first flown in January 1969, 46 built.
MU-2J (MU-2B-35)
Variant with improved engines, eleven inch increase in cabin length and increased gross weight, 108 built.

Revised variant of the MU-2L with increased weight, and increased cabin pressure.

Improved variant with four-bladed propellers and other improvements including an extra cabin window, 36 built.

Variant with improved engines, 139 built.
Cavenaugh Cargoliner
Freighter conversions of long fuselage MU-2 variants by Cavenaugh Aviation Inc. of Conroe, Texas, by addition of a crew door in place of a flight deck window and a large cargo door in the rear port fuselage. Eleven aircraft had been converted by March 1987.

Military
LR-1
Japanese military designation for MU-2C and MU-2Ks operated by the JGSDF, 20 delivered.
MU-2S
Japanese military designation for a MU-2E search and rescue variant for the air force, 29 delivered.

Aircraft on display
Australia
 An MU-2 is on display at the Australian Aviation Heritage Centre at Darwin International Airport, Australia.

Mexico
An MU-2P (code ETE-1357) is on display at the Museo Militar de Aviacion at the Felipe Ángeles International Airport in Santa Lucia, Mexico.

United States
An MU-2 is on display at Sparks Aviation at the Tulsa International Airport in Tulsa, Oklahoma.

Incidents and accidents
As of November 2019, there have been 161 documented incidents and 363 deaths involving the MU-2. Listed below are a select few of the most notable ones.
 On 19 April 1993, an MU-2B-60 owned by the State of South Dakota, registration number N86SD, sustained extensive damage to the fuselage and left-hand wing and engine mounts after a propeller blade separation during cruise. All eight people aboard the aircraft died, including Governor of South Dakota George S. Mickelson. Later that April, investigators' findings prompted the FAA to order the immediate inspection of Hartzell propellers similar to those on the accident aircraft. The accident was attributed to metal fatigue of the propeller hub caused by improper design and manufacturing.
 On 6 October 2000, an MU-2B-26A, registration number N60BT, crashed in a wooded area short of Runway 24 at Martha's Vineyard Airport in Edgartown, Massachusetts, during a landing approach in low visibility. The crash killed pilot and former New Jersey State Senator Charles B. Yates, his wife, and two of their children. The NTSB attributed the crash to the pilot's failure to follow instrument flight procedures, with the low cloud ceiling being a contributing factor; the report also noted that he had initiated but failed to complete MU-2 specific flight training.
 On 29 March 2016, an MU-2B-60 operated by Aero Teknic, a Canadian aircraft maintenance company, crashed on approach to Îles-de-la-Madeleine Airport, killing all seven people aboard, including former Canadian politician Jean Lapierre, his family, and the two pilots. An initial survivor died of a heart attack after being pulled from the wreckage. The Transportation Safety Board of Canada investigated the crash and determined that the pilot's decision to continue an unstable approach resulted in loss of control during final approach.

Specifications (MU-2L)

See also

References

External links

 Mitsubishi Heavy Industries America MU-2 Official Website

MU-2, Mitsubishi
MU-2
Aircraft first flown in 1963
High-wing aircraft
Japanese business aircraft
Twin-turboprop tractor aircraft